My Little Pony: Make Your Mark is a computer-animated comedy streaming television series tied to the fifth incarnation (also referred to as the fifth generation or "G5") of Hasbro's My Little Pony toyline.

Set after the events of the film My Little Pony: A New Generation (2021), the series follows five ponies—Sunny Starscout (Jenna Warren), an idealistic earth pony; Izzy Moonbow (Ana Sani), a creative unicorn; Hitch Trailblazer (J.J. Gerber), a responsible earth pony; and sisters Zipp Storm (Maitreyi Ramakrishnan) and Pipp Petals (AJ Bridel), two pegasi princesses—on their adventures across Equestria.

Developed by Gillian Berrow for Netflix, the 44-minute special episode Make Your Mark premiered as a teaser on May 26, 2022, followed by the release of eight further episodes on September 26. The series is being animated by Atomic Cartoons, with its order of four 44-minute special episodes and twenty-three 22-minute episodes.

Premise
Many generations after Twilight Sparkle became the ruler of Equestria, Sunny Starscout, Izzy Moonbow, Hitch Trailblazer, and the sisters Pipp Petals and Zipp Storm—the "Mane Five"—live in Maretime Bay, after having brought back magic to the world. Sunny's home, the Crystal Brighthouse, now holds the Unity Crystals, special magical objects created by Twilight long ago. The three pony kinds—unicorns, pegasi and earth ponies—have been reunited, but still face some obstacles in living together and dealing with their newfound magic, especially the earth ponies' new ability to make plants instantly grow out of the ground.

Sunny and her friends go on adventures and live life, and their friendship grows as they learn to understand each other's differences and deal with various challenges. Meanwhile, the immortal alicorn Opaline, weakened and forgotten by the world, desires to take all the magic in Equestria for herself and rule the land. She sends her unicorn assistant Misty, who knows little about the world outside Opaline's castle, to spy on Sunny and her friends in furtherance of Opaline's plans as she promised to give Misty her own Cutie Mark, a symbol that appears on a ponies' flank when they discover their special talent. Misty is rarely successful, but sometimes finds herself enjoying life in Maretime Bay and begins to discover that the outside world is broader than Opaline has told her.

Voice cast

Main
Jenna Warren as Sunny Starscout, a bright-eyed earth pony/alicorn who runs a smoothie stand in Maretime Bay and seeks to make the world a better place.
J.J. Gerber as Hitch Trailblazer, an earth pony with an affinity for critters who serves as the sheriff of Maretime Bay.
Ana Sani as Izzy Moonbow, a happy-go-lucky unicorn from Bridlewood who enjoys arts and crafts.
AJ Bridel as Pipp Petals, a pegasus princess from Zephyr Heights with a wide fan following and a pop star persona, and the owner of the Maretime Bay karaoke hair salon Mane Melody.
Maitreyi Ramakrishnan as Zephyrina "Zipp" Storm, a rebellious and inquisitive pegasus princess from Zephyr Heights and Pipp's older sister.
Rob Tinkler as Sparky Sparkeroni, a baby dragon with chaotic, powerful magic who is adopted by Hitch.
Athena Karkanis as Opaline, a menacing alicorn who seeks to control all of Equestria and its magic.
Bahia Watson as Misty, a timid unicorn who was taken in by Opaline as a filly and serves as her assistant.

Supporting
Amanda Martinez as Queen Haven, the ruler of Zephyr Heights and Pipp and Zipp's mother.
Kimberly-Ann Truong as Posey Bloom, an earth pony who distrusted magic at first, but grew to like it after receiving earth pony magic.
Samantha Bielanski as Jazz Hooves, an earth pony employed at Mane Melody as a manicurist and singer.
Jonathan Tan as Rocky Riff, a pegasus employed at Mane Melody as a mane stylist and singer.
Joshua Graham as Sprout, the former deputy sheriff and one-time self-proclaimed emperor of Maretime Bay.
Tara Strong as Twilight Sparkle, an alicorn who was the Princess of Friendship and the ruler of Equestria. She appears through a hologram in the Brighthouse.
Elley-Ray Hennessy as Grandma Figgy, Hitch's grandmother.
Andrew Jackson as Alphabittle Blossomforth, a unicorn who runs the Crystal Tea Room in Bridlewood.

Episodes

Series overview

Chapter 1 (2022)

Chapter 2 (2022)

Chapter 3 (2022)

Production

Development
In 2019, when My Little Pony: Friendship Is Magic concluded and "close[d] that chapter of Pony history", Hasbro began working on a fifth incarnation. To fit Generation Alpha's higher emotional intelligence, Entertainment One Vice President Emily Thompson stated more peer groups would be represented in the core cast. For example, the main character, Sunny Starscout, is "an activist working to make the pony world a better place." When development began, My Little Pony aimed to expand the namesake franchise's world rather than create a new one, unlike the previous incarnations. Like Friendship Is Magic, the series will be set in Equestria, the production team wanting to further explore the lore and worldbuilding established by the fourth incarnation. However, the fifth incarnation will be set in after the events of the fourth, focusing on different ponies and unexplored parts of Equestria. For Hasbro, this gave them the opportunity to include easter eggs to the previous incarnations.

In February 2021, it was revealed that a computer-animated series had been green-lit for release on Netflix in 2022, as a follow-up to the film My Little Pony: A New Generation. Atomic Cartoons stated in May 2021 that it would be producing the My Little Pony series, and its parent company Thunderbird Entertainment disclosed later that year that 27 episodes were in the Atomic Cartoons production pipeline. 

After the release of My Little Pony: A New Generation on September 24, 2021, the title My Little Pony: Make Your Mark, as well as the amount of content planned for 2022, was revealed by Entertainment One in a press release on February 17, 2022.

The new voices of the five main ponies were also revealed by the new voice actors on social media on February 17, 2022. In interviews, Maitreyi Ramakrishnan (the voice of Zipp Storm) stated that she had been immediately "on board" with the project upon knowing it was My Little Pony, having previously been a fan of animation such as Pixar films and My Little Pony: Friendship Is Magic.

Release
A 44-minute special, titled Make Your Mark, premiered on May 26, 2022, as a teaser. Chapter 2 of the series, featuring eight 22-minute episodes, was released on Netflix on September 26. To promote the series, the online game My Little Pony: Visit Maretime Bay was released on Roblox on September 29, 2022, and a "Visit Maretime Bay" ad campaign was created in partnership with the travel site Tripadvisor.

Another double-length special episode, Winter Wishday, was released on Netflix on November 21.

Notes

References

External links

2020s American animated television series
2022 American television series debuts
2020s Canadian animated television series
2022 Canadian television series debuts
American children's animated comedy television series
American children's animated fantasy television series
American computer-animated television series
Animated television series about horses
Canadian children's animated comedy television series
Canadian children's animated fantasy television series
Canadian computer-animated television series
English-language Netflix original programming
Fantasy comedy television series
My Little Pony television series
Netflix children's programming
Television about magic
Television about unicorns
Television series by Entertainment One